This is a list of citrus fruits:

Hybrid

Citron

Papeda

See also

 List of lemon dishes and drinks

External links
"The Citrus Family Tree", National Geographic

Lists of foods
Lists of plants